The field hockey competition at the 1976 Summer Olympics, which was held in the Percival Molson Memorial Stadium at the McGill University, on an artificial surface for the first time. Only a men's competition occurred.

New Zealand won the gold medal for the first time by defeating Australia 1–0 in the final. Pakistan won the bronze medal by defeating the Netherlands 3–2.

Squads

Preliminary round

Group A

Group B

Classification round

Ninth to eleventh place classification

9–11th place semi-final

Ninth place game

Fifth to eighth place classification

5–8th place semi-finals

Seventh place game

Fifth place game

Medal round

Semi-finals

Bronze medal match

Gold medal match

Statistics

Final standings

Goalscorers

Medallists

References

External links
 Official Report

 
Field hockey at the Summer Olympics
1976 Summer Olympics events
Summer Olympics
1976 Summer Olympics